Line 6 Branch of Shenzhen Metro, also known as Branch Line 6, is a metro line in Shenzhen. Despite being nominally the branch of Line 6, it is actually a separate line, whose color, train type and train numbers are all different from those of the main line of Line 6.

Sections

Phase 1
Phase 1 from Shenzhen Institute of Advanced Technology to Guangming opened on 28 November 2022.

Phase 2
Phase 2 from Guangming to Guangmingcheng is expected to be opened in 2025.

Northern extension
A reserved northern extension from SIAT, currently under planning and not submitted to National Development and Reform Commission, will connect Line 6 Branch with Dongguan Rail Transit Line 1.

Stations

References 

Shenzhen Metro lines